Strathearn is a place in Scotland.

Strathearn may also refer to:

 Strathearn (Edmonton), a neighbourhood in Edmonton, Alberta
 Duke of Cumberland and Strathearn
 Duke of Kent and Strathearn
 Duke of Connaught and Strathearn
 Earl of Strathearn
 Strathearn School in Belfast, Northern Ireland
 Strathearn, Alderley, an Anzac Cottage in Brisbane, Queensland, Australia